Farlowella oxyrryncha is a species of armored catfish of the family native to Brazil, Bolivia, Ecuador, Peru and Venezuela with questionable reports from Argentina.  This species grows to a length of  SL.

References 
 

oxyrryncha
Fish of South America
Fish of Bolivia
Fish of Brazil
Fish of Ecuador
Fish of Peru
Fish of Venezuela
Fish described in 1853